Slobodan Škrbić (Serbian Cyrillic: Cлoбoдaн Шкpбић; 18 October 1944 – 16 March 2022) was a Serbian professional footballer who played as a defender for Red Star Belgrade and French club Lille. He made four appearances for the SFR Yugoslavia national team.

He died in Belgrade on 16 March 2022, at the age of 77.

References

External links
 Profile on Serbian federation site

1944 births
2022 deaths
Serbian footballers
Yugoslav footballers
Footballers from Belgrade
Association football defenders
Yugoslavia international footballers
Yugoslav First League players
Ligue 1 players
Red Star Belgrade footballers
Lille OSC players
Yugoslav expatriate footballers
Serbian expatriate footballers
Yugoslav expatriate sportspeople in France
Expatriate footballers in France